Sangeetha Sajith (1976 – 22 May 2022) was an Indian playback singer, known for her works in the South Indian film industry. She has sung over 200 songs across Malayalam, Tamil, Telugu and Kannada films. Sangeetha got her breakthrough with the song Tanneerum Kathalik from the 1996 Tamil film Mr Romeo, composed by AR Rahman.

Life and career
Sangeetha made her playback singing debut in 1992 through the Tamil film Naalaiya Theerpumadu. Her debut in the Malayalam film industry came in 1998 with the song Ambilipoovattam Ponnurulil  from the movie Ennu Swantham Janakikutty. She is known among the Malayaliaudience for the Malayalam songs like 'Dhum Dhum Dhum Dureyeto' from 'Raklipaat', 'Aalare Govinda' from 'Kakkakuili', 'Odathandil Talam Kotum' from 'Pazhassiraja' and 'Talam Poi Tappum Poi' from 'Ayyappanum Koshii'. The theme song of Prithviraj starrer 'Kuruti' was her last song in Malayalam.

Sangeeta has sung for more than 100 audio cassettes in Malayalam and Tamil. She has also composed the music for the film Adukkalail Pani Undu. Sangeetha was also known for imitating KB Sundarambal's voice. When Sangeetha sang during Tamil Nadu government's film award ceremony, the then Chief Minister Jayalalitha, who was a witness, came up to the stage and presented Sangeetha with a gold necklace from her neck.

Death
Sangeetha died on 22 May 2022. She died after reportedly suffering from a kidney-related problem.

References

1976 births
2022 deaths
Singers from Kerala
20th-century Indian singers
Indian women playback singers
Indian women classical singers
Kannada playback singers
Telugu playback singers
Film musicians from Kerala
21st-century Indian singers
20th-century Indian women singers
21st-century Indian women singers
Women musicians from Kerala